Ferocactus glaucescens, the glaucous barrel cactus, is a species of flowering plant in the family Cactaceae, native to the limestone hills of Hidalgo, endemic to México.

In cultivation in temperate regions it must be grown under glass. It has gained the Royal Horticultural Society's Award of Garden Merit.

There is a spineless form, Ferocactus glaucescens forma nuda (inermis).

Synonyms

References

External links
Ferocactus glaucescens at Cactus Art nursery

glaucescens
Cacti of Mexico
Endemic flora of Mexico
Flora of Hidalgo (state)